Y0 may refer to:

 year 0, first year
 Y0 class, a star class with brown dwarfs
 Yakuza 0